The mass line is the political, organizational and leadership method developed by Mao Zedong and the Chinese Communist Party (CCP) during the Chinese Communist Revolution. It refers to formulating policy based on theory, implementing it based people's real world conditions, revising theory and policy based on actual practice, and using that revised theory as the guide to future practice. In Maoist terms, it is summarized by the phrase, "To the masses - from the masses - to the masses."

Mao developed it into a organizing methodology that encompasses philosophy, strategy, tactics, leadership and organizational theory that has been applied by many communists subsequent to the Chinese Communist Revolution. CCP leaders generally attribute their conquest of power to the faithful pursuit of effective "mass line" tactics, and a "correct" mass line is supposed to be the essential prerequisite for the full consolidation of power.

History
In its original conception, the mass line referred to both an ideological goal as well as a working method based on "pooling the wisdom of the masses" from which CCP leadership could formulate policy after further deliberation, adjustments, implementation and experimentation, which would in turn continue to receive feedback from the masses. First, an initial policy is formulated based on historical analysis and theory. As it is implemented, the policy and underlying theory are revised consistent with the actual real world conditions. This revised theory than becomes the guide to future correct action. Thus, the mass line is a method in which theory is refined by practice. 

In Maoist politics, the mass line is summarized in the phrase, "To the masses- from the masses - to the masses." The mass line is characterized by the CCP listening to the scattered ideas of the people, turning them into systemic ideas, and returning them to the people as a guide for action. The process of "pooling the wisdom of the masses" through soliciting and aggregating views and adjusting and testing decisions repeats in an "endless spiral."

The mass line is based on pragmatic considerations as well as both present and historical Chinese beliefs about the importance of wise rulers reading signs of popular discontent in order to avoid social calamity. According to academic Lin Chun, Mao's conception of the mass line reflected his faith in the people as well as a theory of "history from below."  

After recognizing that large numbers of cadres properly trained in mass line tactics were critically needed for the CCP's building of a "complete socialist order", the CCP intensified its cadre training program in 1950–1951 to ensure that all cadres and other workers would be "carefully indoctrinated in basic Marxist-Leninist mass line theory and practice".

Training in mass line tactics ranges in scope from propaganda to public administration, according to UCLA professor Arthur Steiner. Its principal focus, however, is in the "delicate area" of the CCP's dealings with the masses of Chinese people who have not yet bought into the communist program. In the early 1950s, the problem was sufficiently serious and urgent that CCP leadership temporarily deferred several important social reforms pending the completion of the cadre training program.

Steiner writes that Mao rose to pre-eminence in the CCP because he understood the requirements for effecting the strongest possible organization of the Chinese masses in unstable political circumstances. Since the days of his early activity among the peasantry of Hunan Province, Mao preached that the CCP must rely on the masses for its strength, that it must serve their needs, "draw inspiration" from them, and orient its political ideology and organizational tactics to their responsiveness.

Mao criticized Joseph Stalin for a lack of faith in the peasantry and the masses of people, being mechanical in his understanding of the development of socialism, and not actively engaging the masses in the struggle for socialism. Regarding Stalin, Mao wrote in 1961: Politics in command' and the 'mass line' are not stressed. There is no discussion of 'walking on two legs', and individual material interest is onesidedly emphasized. Material incentives are proclaimed and individualism is far too prominent." The Mass Line is a method of leadership that seeks ostensibly to "learn from the peasants."

21st century revival
One of the distinctive features of the national leadership of Chinese Communist Party general secretary Xi Jinping has been the revival of the mass line in CCP theory and praxis. As of 2014, this revival is still ongoing, and is "not a short-term movement" according to the People's Daily. A new official website has been launched, focusing on the mass line.

In his own words, Xi has described the campaign in terms of "purification" of the CCP, often involving the elimination of "hedonism and extravagance", although the purification implied is sometimes extended metaphorically to issues such as "reducing air pollution".

As part of this campaign, Xi Jinping has declared that "All Party organs and members should be frugal and make determined efforts to oppose ostentation and reject hedonism", although the interpretation of what this means seems to have varied from one province to the next somewhat. Hebei province reportedly reduced public spending on official receptions by 24%, cancelled the order of 17,000 new cars, and punished 2,750 government officials. The Economist reported two specific examples of punishments under the new mass line: the suspended death sentence for corruption given to Liu Zhijun and charging the 17-year-old-son of a high-ranking military officer for an alleged connection to a gang rape. Perhaps 20,000 party officials were punished within the first year of the revival campaign.

Some China experts argue that: "If implemented not as a propaganda tool but as a mechanism of interest articulation and aggregation, the mass line has the potential to offer China alternative routes of democratization."

Connection with propaganda

According to Steiner, the mass line is closely related to the CCP's propaganda apparatus. Despite the vast output from the CCP's propaganda apparatus, in January 1951 the Central Committee published a directive condemning as a "principal weakness of the Party's propaganda" a failure to effectively give "systematic guidance and control of various levels of party organizations".

The directive said that "One of the inborn duties of a Communist lies in the incessant effort to carry out propaganda among the people so as to educate them, to wage relentless war against all reactionary and mistaken conceptions and principles, and to promote as well as raise the political consciousness of the masses."

The directive called for the establishment of networks of "propaganda officers"—one in every party cell—and "reporting officers" at higher levels. Propaganda activity was to be conducted among the masses under strict control and in "fixed activity programs". Among other duties, propaganda officers were to maintain "constant public contact" so they could "assist the Party in the choice of propaganda matter and methods appropriate for different periods of time".

Earlier directives connected the need to boost consciousness of the mass line with criticisms and self-criticisms in the press. CCP members were supposed to "be trained to appreciate that criticism and self-criticism in newspapers and periodicals are necessary methods for strengthening the relations between the Party and the popular masses".

Mass organizations

During the Maoist era the state supported a range of mass organizations, coordinated by the CCP through its united front system. The most significant of the mass organizations encompassed large numbers of people from major social groups, including workers through trade unions, students, youth, and women. Their purpose was to "penetrate society, to bring vast sections of the population further into the party's net", Frederick Teiwes writes. The effort was skewed, however, and coverage was far more extensive in urban areas, with peasant associations existing only sporadically.

Influence outside the Chinese Communist Party

The largest self-proclaimed Maoist party in the US, the Revolutionary Communist Party, which proclaims itself adopted the concept of "mass line" during the 1970s.

See also
Propaganda in the People's Republic of China
Thought reform in the People's Republic of China
General line of the party (Soviet Union)

References

Ideology of the Chinese Communist Party
Maoism
Maoist China